Mount McCarthy may refer to:

 Mount McCarthy (Prince Charles Mountains)
 Mount McCarthy (Victoria Land)